Quitaque is a city in southeastern Briscoe County, Texas, United States. The town lies directly south of Capcrock Canyon State Park and is a ranching and farming area in West Texas. The population was 411 at the 2010 census.

According to tradition, Quitaque is a name derived from an American Indian language, meaning "end of the trail".

Geography
Quitaque is located along Texas State Highway 86 between Silverton to the west and Turkey to the east. The entrance to Caprock Canyons State Park is located about three miles north of Quitaque on Farm to Market Road 1065, and the Caprock Canyons Trailway is located just south of the town. Kent Creek flows past north of the town and Quitaque Creek is about three miles south.

Climate
According to the Köppen climate classification system, Quitaque has a semiarid climate, BSk on climate maps.

Demographics

2020 census

As of the 2020 United States census, there were 342 people, 155 households, and 94 families residing in the city.

2000 census
As of the census of 2000, 432 people, 182 households, and 117 families resided in the city. The population density was 600.8 people per square mile (231.7/km). The 252 housing units averaged 350.5 per square mile (135.1/km). The racial makeup of the city was 79.40% White, 5.79% African American, 0.23% Native American, 12.50% from other races, and 2.08% from two or more races. Hispanics or Latinos of any race were 27.08% of the population.

Of the 182 households, 28.0% had children under the age of 18 living with them, 49.5% were married couples living together, 11.5% had a female householder with no husband present, and 35.2% were not families. About 33.0% of all households were made up of individuals, and 17.6% had someone living alone who was 65 years of age or older. The average household size was 2.37 and the average family size was 3.04.

In the city, the population was distributed as 27.5% under the age of 18, 5.6% from 18 to 24, 20.1% from 25 to 44, 27.8% from 45 to 64, and 19.0% who were 65 years of age or older. The median age was 42 years. For every 100 females, there were 87.0 males. For every 100 females age 18 and over, there were 84.1 males.

The median income for a household in the city was $27,143, and for a family was $33,750. Males had a median income of $28,750 versus $18,125 for females. The per capita income for the city was $13,619. About 14.1% of families and 18.5% of the population were below the poverty line, including 28.6% of those under age 18 and 13.0% of those age 65 or over.

Arts and culture
Governor Greg Abbott declared the city the Bison Capital of Texas in 2015. A BisonFest is held every year to raise money for the bison herd at Caprock Canyons.

Education
The City of Quitaque is served by the Turkey-Quitaque Independent School District.

Notable people
The Texas high-school and college football coach Gene Mayfield was born in Quitaque in 1928.

See also
Quitaque Creek
Little Red River (Texas)
Caprock Escarpment
Prairie Dog Town Fork Red River

References

Cities in Briscoe County, Texas
Cities in Texas